John Monroe PC, QC (1839 – September 1899), was an Irish lawyer and judge.

Background and education
Monroe was born at Moira, County Down, eldest son of John Monroe senior and Jane Harvey. He was educated at Queens College Galway, where he was auditor of the college's Literary and Debating Society for two years, from 1860 to 1862, and at the King's Inns, where he was auditor of the Law Students' Debating Society of Ireland for the 1862–1863 session.

Legal career
Monroe was called to the Irish Bar in 1863; he took silk in 1877 and became a Bencher of the King's Inns in 1884. For a short period (1879 to 1880) he was Law Adviser to the Lord Lieutenant of Ireland. He was appointed Solicitor-General for Ireland in June 1885 but relinquished the post in November upon his appointment to a judgeship of the Landed Estates Court. Failing health caused him to resign this post in 1893. He was appointed to the Irish Privy Council in 1886. He had a good reputation in the legal field and was regarded as an expert on the Irish Land situation.

Personal life
Monroe died at Dalkey, County Dublin, in September 1899. He married Elizabeth Moule, daughter of John Watkins Moule and Jane Harvie, of the prominent Moule family of Elmley  Lovett,  Worcestershire, in 1867, and had seven children. Their eldest son, Walter Stanley Monroe, later became Prime Minister of Newfoundland. A younger son, Horace, became a clergyman attached to St. Patrick's Cathedral, Dublin , and wrote a short history of his mother's family. The Moule marriage created a family tie with one of Ireland's foremost judges, Hugh Holmes, who married Elizabeth's sister Olivia.

References

1839 births
1899 deaths
Alumni of the University of Galway
Members of the Privy Council of Ireland
People from County Down
People from Dalkey
Solicitors-General for Ireland
Irish Queen's Counsel
Alumni of King's Inns